Blue Blvd is an album by American musician Dave Alvin. It was released in 1991.

Production
Alvin worked on the songs over a period of years after the release of his first solo album, in 1987.  He dealt with health issues, worked on film soundtracks, and helped other musicians. The album employed a fuller production sound than Alvin's previous album, Romeo's Escape, courtesy of Alvin, Chris Silagyi, and Bruce Bromberg.

Reception
AllMusic critic Denise Sullivan wrote: "The only thing that mars this wonderful, rootsy singer/songwriter album is a heavy production hand and a drum sound attempting to give it a rock edge; consequently, some of the more beautiful songs like the title track suffer under the weight, but the final cut, 'Dry River,' is alone worth the price of the disc." The Washington Post called the album "11 songs so emotionally compelling and finely crafted that they remind one of Raymond Carver's short stories." The Spin Alternative Record Guide wrote that it "offers some idiosyncratic gems." Trouser Press wrote that Alvin's "no-frills singing sometimes fails to hold the spotlight, especially when the backing players crank up."

Track listing
All songs by Dave Alvin.
"Blue Blvd" – 4:53
"Guilty Man" – 4:36
"Haley's Comet" – 4:21
"Why Did She Stay with Him" – 4:20
"Rich Man's Town" – 3:56
"Gospel Night" – 4:50
"Plastic Rose" – 4:18
"Brand New Heart" – 3:36
"Wanda and Duane" – 3:57
"Andersonville" – 5:45
"Dry River" – 3:54

Personnel
Dave Alvin – vocals, guitar
Don Falzone – bass
Rick Solem – piano, organ
Bobby Lloyd Hicks – drums
Donald Lindley – drums
Greg Leisz – guitar, mandolin, lap steel guitar, pedal steel guitar
Lee Allen – tenor saxophone
Dwight Yoakam – background vocals
David Hidalgo – background vocals
Terry Evans – background vocals
Katy Moffatt – background vocals

Production notes
Chris Silagyi – producer
Bruce Bromberg – producer
Dave Alvin – producer
Michael Becker – engineer
Steve Shepherd – engineer
Paul DuGre – engineer
Geza X – engineer
Steve Klein – mixing
Bernie Grundman – mastering
Terri Lande Bromberg – design
Beth Herzhaft – photography

References

1991 albums
Dave Alvin albums
HighTone Records albums